Hiroshi Ikeda (池田 裕 Ikeda Hiroshi, born 1950) is a Japanese aikido teacher in the United States. He holds the rank of 7th dan (shihan) from the Aikikai. He is the most senior student of Mitsugi Saotome of Aikido Schools of Ueshiba (ASU).

Ikeda was born in Tokyo and began studying aikido in 1968 while attending college at Kokugakuin University in Tokyo.  He relocated to Sarasota, Florida in 1976, and taught there under Saotome from 1978-1979.   In 1980, he moved to Boulder, Colorado to establish a dojo there under Saotome's ASU organization. In January, 2015 Saotome decided to recognize Ikeda as an independent instructor so that he can pursue his own objectives apart from ASU.

Ikeda currently lives in Boulder, where he operates his dojo, Boulder Aikikai. He also travels frequently to conduct seminars both in the United States and abroad.

References

External links 
 Boulder Aikikai
 国際合気道講習大会 | 講師紹介/Instructors

1950 births
American aikidoka
Living people
Sportspeople from Tokyo
Japanese emigrants to the United States